The XVI Corps is a corps of the Indian Army raised on 1 June 1972 with Lieutenant General J F R Jacob as its first General Officer Commanding (GOC). It has its headquarters at Nagrota Cantonment, (Jammu district), Jammu and Kashmir. In 2005, IX Corps was raised in southern part of the XVI Corps' area, taking over two of its divisions.

Organisation
The corps is reported to include 10th Infantry Division (RAPID) (Crossed Swords Division), headquartered at Akhnoor; 25 Infantry Division (Ace of Spades Division), headquartered at Rajouri and 39 Infantry Division (Dah Division), with its headquarters at Yol. Delta Force, Romeo Force and Uniform Force of the Rashtriya Rifles come under the operational control of the corps.

It is the largest wheeled formation in the world. Its current General Officer Commanding is Lieutenant General Majinder Singh.

List of commanders

References

Further reading 
 Richard A. Renaldi and Ravi Rikhe, Indian Army Order of Battle, Orbat.com for Tiger Lily Books: A division of General Data LLC, 2011.

External links
 Globalsecurity.org, Nagrota Corps / XVI Corps / White Knight Corps, accessed July 2010
Official twitter handle

016
Military units and formations established in 1972